Wales Interactive Limited is a Welsh independent video game developer and publisher established in 2011 and based in Penarth, Wales. The studio, best known for Maid of Sker, The Bunker, Five Dates and The Complex, have published over 30 video game titles for PC, mobile and video game consoles. They are a multi award winning studio with accolades including BAFTA Cymru Games Award 2012 and 2018, Appster's Award for Best Indie Game Developer 2014, GREAT Face of British Business Winner 2015, South Wales Business of the Year 2014 and 2016, and Wales Technology Award Winner 2017 and 2018. The studio supports a variety of gaming platforms including PlayStation 5, Xbox Series X and Series S, Nintendo Switch, and Microsoft Windows as well as virtual reality devices including HTC Vive, Oculus Quest 2 and PlayStation VR. Wales Interactive develop and publish their own original intellectual property as well as third-party titles. Wales Interactive is noted for being part of the mid-2010s revival of the genre of FMV games, i.e. their titles The Bunker, Late Shift and others all substitute traditional game mechanics with live action footage.

History 
The company was formed in 2012 by co-founders Dr David Banner MBE and Richard Pring. Both founders previously co-managed GamesLab Wales together under University of Glamorgan (now University of South Wales). Banner, a former employee of Pivotal Games and Eidos Interactive, also founded the Wales Games Development Show. Wales Interactive was formed with an aim to create original games that entertain the world as well as put Wales on the video games map. The studio began and remains as a tenant of the Sony UK Technology Centre in Pencoed, Bridgend.

Most of Wales Interactive's early work consisted of mobile apps and games as well as a series of Welsh e-books which were supported by S4C's digital fund. In 2013, they shifted development to focus on PC and consoles with their title, Gravity Badgers, and the psychological horror Master Reboot. The development team released Infinity Runner with Oculus Rift support, a first for the company. Infinity Runner went on to being the first PlayStation 4 and Xbox One game to be made entirely in Wales. The studio gained a major publication feature in a studio profile for Edge, which coincided with the early access development stages of their science fiction adventure game Soul Axiom.

In 2015, Wales Interactive established its third-party publishing label. They partnered with UK independent developers Milky Tea to bring their title Coffin Dodgers to Xbox One and PlayStation 4. The studio continues to develop their label by co-developing and publishing the FMV survival horror video game The Bunker.

In July 2020, Wales Interactive announced an FMV title called Gamer Girl scheduled to be released on PC, PS4, Switch and Xbox One in September 2020. In the game, the player is a moderator for Alexandra "Abicake99" Burton, a popular female streamer, and must help control her chat and stream content as well as make personal decisions for her. The game was being touted as the first "improvised" FMV game. The game's trailer received ridicule from the wider community, with many people calling it Simp Simulator. In response, Wales Interactive took down the trailer and removed all references to the game from their website.

Games

Published games

Entertainment and interactive books

References

External links 
 Official website

British companies established in 2011
Video game companies established in 2011
2011 establishments in Wales
Video game development companies
Video game publishers
Privately held companies of Wales
Pencoed
Video game companies of the United Kingdom